Shri Datta Meghe Polytechnic, Nagpur is a polytechnic college in Nagpur, India. It was established in 1983 by Nagar Yuvak Shikshan Sanstha, Nagpur and named after the Indian parliament member Shri. Dattaji Meghe. Currently this institute is maintained by NYSS.

Its original location was Atre Layout Nagpur, but now it has moved in its new large spacious building at YCCE campus Wanadongri Nagpur.

Owing to low enrollment , Shri Datta Megha Polytechnic closed down in year 2020.

See also 
 List of educational institutions in Nagpur#Polytechnic Colleges

References

External links
 

Universities and colleges in Nagpur
Science and technology in Nagpur
Educational institutions established in 1983
1983 establishments in Maharashtra